Issa Sarr (born 9 October 1986) is a Senegalese professional footballer who currently plays for South African club Uthongathi.

References

External links

1986 births
Living people
Association football midfielders
Sportspeople from Thiès
Senegalese footballers
ASC Jaraaf players
AS Pikine players
Platinum Stars F.C. players
Chippa United F.C. players
Orlando Pirates F.C. players
Uthongathi F.C. players
South African Premier Division players
National First Division players
2011 African Nations Championship players
Senegal A' international footballers
Senegalese expatriate sportspeople in South Africa
Senegalese expatriate footballers
Expatriate soccer players in South Africa